Anthony Thompson (born March 23, 1990) is a professional Canadian football defensive back for the BC Lions of the Canadian Football League (CFL). He was drafted 12th overall in the 2016 CFL Draft by the Lions. He played college football with the Southern Illinois Salukis.

Professional career
Thompson re-signed with the BC Lions on June 23, 2021.

References

External links
BC Lions bio

1990 births
Living people
BC Lions players
Canadian football defensive backs
Southern Illinois Salukis football players
Canadian football people from Montreal
Players of Canadian football from Quebec
Anglophone Quebec people